The 1900 European Rowing Championships were rowing championships held in Paris on the Seine in early September. The 1900 regatta was held between the Courbevoie Bridge and the Asnières Bridge, the same venue that had been used for the 1900 Summer Olympics a week earlier. The competition was for men only and they competed in five boat classes (M1x, M2x, M2+, M4+, M8+).

Medal summary

Footnotes

References

European Rowing Championships
European Rowing Championships
Rowing
Rowing
Sports competitions in Paris
European
European Rowing Championships